Imam Hussain Mosque may refer to:

Imam Husayn Shrine, Kerbala, Iraq, the burial site of Husayn ibn Ali
Imam Hussein Mosque (Kuwait), the largest Shia mosque in Kuwait
Imam Hussein Mosque (Baku), Azerbaijan